Methyloferula is a Gram-negative, mesophilic, psychrotolerant, aerobic and colorless genus of bacteria from the family of Beijerinckiaceae. Up to now there is only one species of this genus known (Methyloferula stellata).

References

Further reading 
 
 
 

Bacteria genera
Monotypic bacteria genera
Beijerinckiaceae